Channel 24 is a Ukrainian 24/7 TV channel. Originally called News Channel 24, it is the part of the Lux Television and Radio Company, a media conglomerate in Ukraine. Channel 24 programming covers politics, the economy, sports and celebrities. The station has been broadcasting continuously in Ukraine since 2006.

Ratings
Channel 24 was launched in March of 2006. Its average share of daily viewership in Ukraine is 1.1%, and its Nielsen average is 0.17%.

Schedule 
News reports are broadcast daily every hour in the morning and every two hours in the afternoon and evening. On weekends, news reports are broadcast every two hours from 9am until 10pm (UTC+2).

Internet presence
In October 2008, the TV channel launched 24tv.ua, a news and information website. Its editor-in-chief is Olha Konsevych. The website is regularly among the top twenty most visited websites in Ukraine, and among the top five most visited news websites in Ukraine.

Channel 24 has an official app available on Android and iOS devices.

Satellite info 

 Satellite — Amos 3/7
 Orbit position — 4°W
 Frequency — 11175 MHz
 Polarization — horizontal (H)
 SR — 30000
 FTA (Free To Air)
 FEC — 3/4

References 

Television stations in Ukraine
Television channels and stations established in 2006
Ukrainian brands
Ukrainian-language television stations in Ukraine